Hamburger Hochbahn AG (HHA), founded in 1911, operates the underground system and large parts of the bus system in Hamburg, Germany.

History 

The HHA was founded by Siemens & Halske and AEG as a consortium on 27 May 1911. The first chairman was Albert Ballin.

From 1919 until 1978, the HHA operated a large tram network, and from 5 December 1921 the HHA also operated the first motor buses in Hamburg. After the acquisition of the Straßen-Eisenbahn-Gesellschaft (SEG) in 1919 and the Hamburg-Altonaer-Centralbahngesellschaft AG in 1923, the HHA had a rolling stock of 865 power cars and 930 trailers by 1928. The length of tracks was 217.33 km. In 1970 the length of the lines were only 82.7 km, in 1978 they were 89.5 km with 80 stations.

In 1965, HHA was one of the founding members of the Hamburger Verkehrsverbund (HVV).

Operations 

HHA operates about 111 bus routes and four underground lines. In spite of the "U" for "underground", large portions, especially outside the inner city, run on the surface. Some parts of the underground, notably along the banks of River Elbe in the city centre, are elevated (hence the name "Hochbahn", "elevated railway").

HHA is the second-largest public transport operator in Germany and the major partner in the Hamburger Verkehrsverbund.

Subsidiaries 
BeNEX GmbH is the holding company for public transport corporations outside of Hamburg. BeNex owns railway and bus companies. In August 2007, the UK listed investment firm International Public Partnerships Limited (then known as Babcock & Brown Public Partnerships) acquired 49% of BeNEX.

Through BeNEX the Hamburger Hochbahn owns 25.1% of the Metronom Eisenbahngesellschaft, a company operating commuter trains in northern Germany. Nordbahn Eisenbahngesellschaft, with Neumünster - Bad Segeberg - Bad Oldesloe railway in Schleswig-Holstein, is owned in joint venture with the AKN railway. Among others there are also the East German Railway plc (50% ownership) and the Cantus Verkehrsgesellschaft, both joint ventures with other corporations.

Notes
 The information in this article is based on its German equivalent

External links

Hamburger Hochbahn AG website 
nordbahn railway company website 
Ostdeutsche Eisenbahn Eastgerman railroag plc website 
Tram Travels: Hamburger Hochbahn (HHA)
 

Transport in Hamburg
Private railway companies of Germany
Hamburg U-Bahn
Railway companies established in 1911
Companies based in Hamburg
Public transport operators of Germany
German companies established in 1911